Recipe of Her Youth is a 1983 Soviet music film directed by Yevgeny Ginzburg.

Plot 
The film tells about the famous three-hundred-year-old actress and the secret of her youth. The film is based on the Czech play The Makropulos Affair by Karel Čapek.

Cast 
 Lyudmila Gurchenko		
 Oleg Borisov
 Aleksandr Abdulov
 Anatoliy Romashin
 Armen Dzhigarkhanyan
 Yelena Stepanova
 Sergey Shakurov
 Anatoliy Kalmykov
 Sergei Dityatev
 Liliya Sabitova

References

External links 
 

1983 films
1980s Russian-language films
Soviet comedy films
1983 comedy films